FK Bane is a football club based in Raška, Serbia. They currently compete in the Šumadija-Raška Zone League, the fourth tier of the national league system.

History
The club was founded in 1931 as FK Studenica. They made their Second League of FR Yugoslavia debut in 1998. The club spent the following six seasons in the second tier, before being relegated to the Serbian League West in 2004.

Honours
Morava Zone League (Tier 4)
 2011–12

Seasons

Notes

Notable players
National team players
  Miljan Mutavdžić
  Miroslav Vulićević
  Milan Dudić
  Đorđe Jokić
For a list of all FK Bane players with a Wikipedia article, see :Category:FK Bane players.

References

External links
 Club page at Srbijasport

 
1931 establishments in Serbia
Association football clubs established in 1931
Football clubs in Serbia
Raška, Serbia